The canton of Nyons et Baronnies is an administrative division of the Drôme department, southeastern France. It was created at the French canton reorganisation which came into effect in March 2015. Its seat is in Nyons.

It consists of the following communes:
 
Arpavon
Aubres
Aulan
Ballons
Barret-de-Lioure
Beauvoisin
Bellecombe-Tarendol
Bénivay-Ollon
Bésignan
Buis-les-Baronnies
La Charce
Châteauneuf-de-Bordette
Chaudebonne
Chauvac-Laux-Montaux
Condorcet
Cornillac
Cornillon-sur-l'Oule
Curnier
Eygalayes
Eygaliers
Eyroles
Ferrassières
Izon-la-Bruisse
Laborel
Lachau
Lemps
Mérindol-les-Oliviers
Mévouillon
Mirabel-aux-Baronnies
Mollans-sur-Ouvèze
Montauban-sur-l'Ouvèze
Montaulieu
Montbrun-les-Bains
Montferrand-la-Fare
Montfroc
Montguers
Montréal-les-Sources
Nyons
Pelonne
La Penne-sur-l'Ouvèze
Piégon
Pierrelongue
Les Pilles
Plaisians
Le Poët-en-Percip
Le Poët-Sigillat
Pommerol
Propiac
Reilhanette
Rémuzat
Rioms
Rochebrune
La Roche-sur-le-Buis
La Rochette-du-Buis
Roussieux
Sahune
Saint-Auban-sur-l'Ouvèze
Sainte-Euphémie-sur-Ouvèze
Sainte-Jalle
Saint-Ferréol-Trente-Pas
Saint-Maurice-sur-Eygues
Saint-May
Saint-Sauveur-Gouvernet
Séderon
Valouse
Venterol
Verclause
Vercoiran
Vers-sur-Méouge
Villebois-les-Pins
Villefranche-le-Château
Villeperdrix
Vinsobres

References

Cantons of Drôme